Piao Cheng (born 21 August 1989) is a Chinese footballer of Korean descent who currently plays for Beijing Guoan in the Chinese Super League.

Club career
Piao Cheng started his football career with second tier side Yanbian FC and was promoted to their first team in 2007 where he would soon score his first goal for them on 18 August 2007 in a 2-1 win against Shanghai Stars and scored the winning goal which was his first for the club. He would then establish himself as a regular within the squad and soon received a call-up to the Chinese under-20 national team in July 2008. He then started to attract the interests of several top tier Chinese sides.  On 25 February 2011, Piao transferred to Chinese Super League side Beijing Guoan for 3 million yuan after impressing many at Yanbian.

At Beijing he would go on to make his debut in a league game on 03 April 2011 against Jiangsu Sainty in a 2-0 victory. Chi would establish himself as an integral member of the team and helped guide the club to a runners-up position at the end of the 2011 Chinese Super League season. Another runners-up position would follow in the 2014 Chinese Super League season before he won his first piece of silverware with the 2018 Chinese FA Cup against Shandong Luneng Taishan.

International career
Piao would be called up to the Chinese under-20 national team that took part in the 2008 AFC U-19 Championship. Throughout the tournament, he would play in three games and scored one goal as China were knocked out in the quarterfinals on 8 November 2008 by Uzbekistan in a penalty shootout. Piao made his debut for the Chinese national team on 31 March 2015 in a 1-1 draw against Tunisia.

Career statistics

Club statistics 
Statistics accurate as of match played 31 January 2023.

International statistics

Honours

Club
Beijing Guoan
Chinese FA Cup: 2018.

References

External links
 
 

1989 births
Living people
People from Yanbian
Chinese footballers
Footballers from Jilin
Chinese people of Korean descent
Chinese Super League players
China League One players
Yanbian Funde F.C. players
Beijing Guoan F.C. players
Footballers at the 2010 Asian Games
2019 AFC Asian Cup players
Association football midfielders
Asian Games competitors for China
China international footballers